General Lloyd may refer to:

Charles Lloyd (Australian general) (1899–1956), Australian Army major general
Charles Lloyd (South Africa) (died 2014), South African Army lieutenant general
Cyril Lloyd (British Army officer) (1906–1989), British Army major general
Francis Lloyd (British Army officer) (1853–1926), British Army lieutenant general
Herbert Lloyd (1883–1957), Australian Army major general
James Lloyd (Maryland politician) (1745–1830), U.S. Army general
Owen Edward Pennefather Lloyd (1854–1941), British Army major general
Richard Eyre Lloyd (1906–1991), British Army major general
Wilfrid Lewis Lloyd (1896–1944), British Army major general

See also
Gerald Lloyd-Verney (1900–1957), British Army major general
Charles Loyd (1891–1973), British Army general
Robert Loyd-Lindsay, 1st Baron Wantage, (1832–1901), British Army brigadier general
Attorney General Lloyd (disambiguation)